Anthony Clair Johnson (born June 23, 1956) is an American former professional baseball left fielder and designated hitter who played for two seasons, initially with the Montreal Expos during the 1981 Montreal Expos season, then the Toronto Blue Jays during the 1982 Toronto Blue Jays season.

External links

1956 births
Living people
African-American baseball players
American expatriate baseball players in Canada
Baseball players from Memphis, Tennessee
Denver Bears players
Gulf Coast Expos players
Jamestown Expos players
LeMoyne–Owen Magicians baseball players
Major League Baseball outfielders
Memphis Chicks players
Montreal Expos players
Syracuse Chiefs players
Toronto Blue Jays players
West Palm Beach Expos players
Southwest Tennessee Saluqis baseball players
21st-century African-American people
20th-century African-American sportspeople